Kevin Korjus (born 9 January 1993) is an Estonian racing driver.

Career

Karting
Kevin Korjus was born in Tallinn, the son of former sidecarcross racer Aivar Korjus. He made his pan-European karting début in 2006, competing in the Rotax Max Euro Challenge for the AGS Racing team. He finished sixth overall in the championship standings, 25 points behind the champion Jack Hawksworth. As well as that, he finished thirteenth in the Challenge finals, as well as being Estonian champion at Junior level. 2007 saw Korjus win the Estonian title once again, and he also picked up the Baltic Junior title and was the winner of the Rotax Max finals. He did however finish runner-up by two points to Mats van den Brand in the Euro Challenge. In 2008, Korjus competed in the Junior classes in the pan-European championship, but progressed to the Senior class in his local championships. In the Junior championships, he won the Euro Challenge and was second to Facundo Chapur in the Challenge Finals and Rotax Max Grand Finals at La Conca, Italy, 2008.

Formula Renault 2.0
While completing his career in karts, Korjus also spent 2008 adjusting to single-seaters, competing in the first Finnish Formula Renault championship. Racing for the T.T. Racing Team, Korjus finished all but one race on the podium, as he finished runner-up to Jesse Krohn in the championship. Of those podiums, three were race victories that came in the final four races of the season, including a double at Ahvenisto. Korjus continued with the team into the 2009 season, but moved into the Formula Renault 2.0 Northern European Cup. Korjus finished all bar one race as he finished fifth in the championship; his best result being a second-place finish at Most.

Korjus stepped up to the Eurocup Formula Renault 2.0 championship for its 2010 season, and moved to the Koiranen Bros. Motorsport team. Despite qualifying on the third row for both races, Korjus won them both, becoming the first driver to win a race in the championship in the newly introduced cars designed by Barazi-Epsilon. He is also the youngest person to win a Eurocup Formula Renault 2.0 season.

Formula Renault 3.5 Series

With his results and potential in the Formula Renault series, Korjus joined the Renault Driver Development programme for the continuation of his career. He was signed to drive for Formula Renault 3.5 Series team Tech 1 Racing in late 2010. On April 17, 2011 he became the youngest driver to win a race in Formula Renault 3.5 Series – at 18 years 3 months and 8 days – with his victory in Monaco in 2008. In 2011 season he placed sixth place overall and second in the Rookie of the Year standings, and finished the season with fastest lap, three wins and four podium finishes during the season.

Korjus began the 2012 season with Tech 1, where he was partnered with series debutant Jules Bianchi. Korjus endured a difficult season, with a string of early retirements and mechanical problems that affected his qualifying performances, though he recovered to finish on the podium in the second race at the Moscow Raceway. However, with three rounds left in the season, Korjus left Tech-1 and joined the Lotus-backed Charouz Racing System team, and his place at Tech 1 was taken by GP3 series runner-up Daniel Abt.

GP3 Series
Korjus left the Formula Renault 3.5 Series at the end of the 2012 season, moving to the GP3 Series for 2013, racing for Koiranen GP. He finished the season seventh overall, recording four podium, he finished in the points in 11 of the season's 16 races.

Formula One
Korjus had his first outing in a Formula One car at the Abu Dhabi young driver test on November 16, 2011, driving a Renault R31.

Korjus served as Lotus F1's testing and reserve driver at the 2012 Italian Grand Prix. With regular driver Romain Grosjean serving a one-race ban for causing a serious accident at the Belgian Grand Prix, the team promoted regular test driver Jérôme d'Ambrosio to fill Grosjean's seat for the race, and Korjus was recruited to fill in the vacant reserve driver position.

European Le Mans Series
In 2014, he moved to sports car racing, driving an ART Grand Prix McLaren MP4-12C in the European Le Mans Series.

Racing record

Career summary

Complete Formula Renault 3.5 Series results
(key) (Races in bold indicate pole position) (Races in italics indicate fastest lap)

Complete Auto GP Results
(key) (Races in bold indicate pole position) (Races in italics indicate fastest lap)

Complete GP3 Series results
(key) (Races in bold indicate pole position) (Races in italics indicate fastest lap)

References

External links

 
 

1993 births
Living people
Sportspeople from Tallinn
Estonian racing drivers
Formula Renault Eurocup drivers
Formula Renault 2.0 NEZ drivers
Finland Formula Renault 2.0 drivers
Formula Renault 2.0 NEC drivers
World Series Formula V8 3.5 drivers
Auto GP drivers
GP3 Series drivers
FIA Formula 3 European Championship drivers
Blancpain Endurance Series drivers
European Le Mans Series drivers
24 Hours of Spa drivers
Koiranen GP drivers
Tech 1 Racing drivers
DAMS drivers
ART Grand Prix drivers
Charouz Racing System drivers
Double R Racing drivers
T-Sport drivers
R-ace GP drivers
24H Series drivers